Graham Rust (born 1942, Hertfordshire, England) is a painter and muralist.

Biography
Graham Redgrave-Rust was born in Hertfordshire, England in 1942. He studied drawing and painting at the Regent Street Art School, the Central School of Arts and Crafts in London and the National Academy of Art in New York. For two years he worked as an artist on Architectural Forum for Time Inc. In 1968 he spent a year as artist in residence at Woodberry Forest School, in Orange, Virginia, United States.

He is internationally renowned for his murals and ceiling paintings. His most important work is the mural "The Temptation" in the entrance hall of Ragley Hall, Warwickshire, which was started in 1969 and finished in 1983. The mural was commissioned by Lord Hertford after he had seen Rust working on a mural in Virginia, USA. The Ragley Hall mural was painted using gouache directly onto the plaster, portraying a view of the Mountain of Temptation and several of Lord Hertfords relatives.

He has illustrated various books including the 1986 edition of 'The Secret Garden', by Frances Hodgson Burnett and the 1993 edition of 'Some Flowers', by Vita Sackville-West.

He has paintings in the collections of the Oxfordshire and Buckinghamshire Light Infantry Museum and Tabley House.

Graham Rust lives and works in Suffolk and illustrated a cookery book by the late Countess of Clanwilliam, who commissioned his first mural painting in 1965.

Exhibitions

 1964	The Insituto Panameneo de Arts, Panama, Drawings
 1965	The Oxford Union, Drawings and Watercolours
 1965	The Jason Gallery, New York, Drawings
 1965	Duncombe Park, Yorkshire, Paintings and Drawings
 1969	Duncombe Park, Yorkshire, Paintings and Drawings
 1972	Hazlitt, Drawings London and Rome
 1973	Hazlitt, Autumn in Provence
 1975	Spink, Rust in India
 1976	Spink, Rust in Greece
 1977	Spink, The West Indies and other works
 1978	Lane Crawford, Hong Kong, Drawings and Watercolours
 1980	40 Belgrave Square and Ragley Hall, R.C.S.B. Benefit
 1981	Gainsborough's House, Suffolk, A Travelers Sketchbook
 1982	Spink, The Holy Land
 1985	The Alpine Gallery, London, R.C.S.B. Benefit
 1987	Leighton House, London, "The Painted House"
 1987	Roger Ramsey Gallery, Chicago
 1988	Stubbs Gallery, New York
 1989	Robert Domergue Inc., San Francisco
 1989	Melrose Place Gallery, Los Angeles
 1990	Colnaghi, London, R.C.S.B. Benefit
 1993	The Museum of Garden History, London
 1996	Raphael Valls Gallery, London
 1999	Marlborough House, London, Sightsavers Benefit
 2006 The Ebury Galleries, London
 2007 The Theatre, Chipping Norton, Oxon
 2007 Chiesa dell'angelo, Lodi
 2007 Neue Theatre, Espelkamp, Germany
 2009 Mish, New York, N.Y.B.G Benefit
 2012 The Brompton Oratory, London, Sightsavers Benefit

Books published 
 1987	"The Painted House" Cassells / USA Bullfinch
 1996	"Decorative Designs" Cassells / USA Bullfinch
 1998 	"Needlepoint Designs" Ward Locke / USA Rizzoli
 2001	"The Painted Ceiling" Constable / USA Little Brown
 2005	"Revisiting The Painted House" Breslich & Foss Ltd

Books illustrated 
 1982	"Recipes From a Chateau In Champagne" Victor Gollancz Ltd
 1986	"The Fruits of the Earth" Michael Joseph / USA David Godine
 1986	"The Secret Garden" Michael Joseph / USA David Godine
 1989	"A Little Princess" Michael Joseph / USA David Godine
 1991	"The Secret Garden Notebook" Letts
 1993	"Some Flowers: Vita Sackville West" Pavilion & National Trust / USA Abrams
 1993	"Little Lord Fauntleroy" Michael Joseph / USA David Godine
 1994	"The Fine Art of Dining" Little Brown
 2001	"Claro en la Selva" Luis Pujadas y Ortiz, Red Lion Express
 2007	"Food For Friends" Somerton

References

External links
http://www.grahamrust-murals.com
http://www.grahamrust.com/about
https://web.archive.org/web/20080704172730/http://www.2004.fauxcademy.com/rust-W.php

1942 births
Living people
English muralists
English illustrators
20th-century English painters
English male painters
21st-century English painters
20th-century English male artists
21st-century English male artists